Michael J. Maker (born February 7, 1969) is an American trainer of Thoroughbred racehorses. The son of a trainer, he learned the business from his father then set up his own public stable in 1991. In 1993 he went to work as an assistant to U.S. Racing Hall of Fame trainer D. Wayne Lukas where he remained until going out on his own again in 2003.

Mike Maker's most important wins came with Furthest Land in the 2009 Breeders' Cup Dirt Mile, the 2011 Breeders' Cup Juvenile with Hansen who would earn American Champion Two-Year-Old Colt honors, and the 2020 Breeders' Cup Juvenile Turf with Fire At Will. In 2010 he won the Blue Grass Stakes with the colt Stately Victor which qualified him for the Kentucky Derby.

References

External links
 Mike Maker's website

1969 births
Living people
People from Garden City, Michigan
American horse trainers